Re:Release is a 2003 compilation album by American hip hop group Juggaknots. It consists of all tracks from Clear Blue Skies and 11 additional tracks.

Critical reception
Todd Kristel of AllMusic gave the album 3 stars out of 5, saying, "with its thick, low-end heavy beats, some good scratches, and Breezly Brewin's deft flow, this album is generally appealing." Greg Doherty of SF Weekly said, "The production is uncompromisingly grainy and midtempo -- the opposite of slick -- with the lyrics carrying most of the momentum." Matt Kallman of Pitchfork gave the album an 8.2 out of 10, commenting that "The bonus tracks are a nice touch in and of themselves, and have some worth considering the limited output of anything wholly Juggaknots, period."

Track listing

References

External links
 

2003 compilation albums
Juggaknots albums
Reissue albums
Albums recorded at WKCR-FM